Gates of Eden may refer to:

 Gates of Eden: American Culture in the Sixties, 1977 book by Morris Dickstein
 Gates of Eden (short story collection), a collection of short stories written by Ethan Coen
 "Gates of Eden" (song), a 1965 Bob Dylan song
 The Gates of Eden, a 1916 silent film
 Gates of Eden (album), a 2006 album by Ralph McTell